Slap is a small settlement above the left bank of the Sava River north of Loka pri Zidanem Mostu in the Municipality of Sevnica in east-central Slovenia. The area is part of the historical region of Styria. The municipality is now included in the Lower Sava Statistical Region.

References

External links
Slap at Geopedia

Populated places in the Municipality of Sevnica